Dinley is a hamlet in the Scottish Borders through which Hermitage Water flows.

Etymology

The first element, din, seems to be the Cumbric word for a fort.

References

Villages in the Scottish Borders